Julian Gutowski (1823–1890) was a member of the Diet of Galicia and Lodomeria and the Imperial Council (Austrian Parliament) in Vienna and the Mayor of Nowy Sącz from 1867 to 1870.

Life 

Gutowski was born in Kraków. After studying law, he worked as a notary in Kraków. In 1867, he was elected as Mayor of Nowy Sącz, where he ran a notary office from 1860 to 1873. His term as Mayor lasted until 1870.

References

1823 births
1890 deaths
19th-century Polish politicians
Mayors of places in Poland
People from Nowy Sącz
Politicians from Kraków